Atlasova (also known as Atlasov or Nylgimelkin) is a basaltic shield volcano situated in Kamchatka. It is named after Russian explorer Vladimir Atlasov.

See also
List of volcanoes in Russia

References

Volcanoes of the Kamchatka Peninsula
Mountains of the Kamchatka Peninsula
Shield volcanoes of Russia
Holocene shield volcanoes
Holocene Asia
Polygenetic shield volcanoes